Quakesat is an Earth observation nanosatellite based on three CubeSats. It was designed to be a proof of concept for space-based detection of extremely low frequency signals, thought by some to be earthquake precursor signals. The science behind the concept is disputed.

Mission 
The students working on the project hope that the detection of magnetic signals may have value in showing the onset of an earthquake. QuakeFinder, the company that put the satellites together, is from Palo Alto, California. They are gathering data on the extremely low magnetic field fluctuations that are associated with earthquakes to help better understand this area of study. The primary instrument is a magnetometer housed in a  telescoping boom.

The 30 June 2003, deployment of Quakesat was alongside other university CubeSats and one commercial CubeSat. The launch occurred on a Rokot rocket from Russia's Plesetsk Cosmodrome.

See also 

 List of CubeSats

References 

QuakeFinder LLC
Single axis search coil, small E-field dipole 

Earth observation satellites of the United States
Spacecraft launched in 2003
CubeSats
Spacecraft launched by Rokot rockets